MediaFLO was a technology developed by Qualcomm for transmitting audio, video and data to portable devices such as mobile phones and personal televisions, used for mobile television. In the United States, the service powered by this technology was branded as FLO TV.

Broadcast data transmitted via MediaFLO includes live, real time audio and video streams, as well as scheduled video and audio clips and shows. The technology could also carry Internet Protocol datacast application data, such as stock market quotes, sports scores, and weather reports.

In October 2010, Qualcomm announced it was suspending new sales of the service to consumers. In December 2010, AT&T announced that it will purchase Qualcomm's FCC licenses in the 700 MHz band. FLO TV discontinued service on March 27, 2011.

Overview

The "FLO" in MediaFLO stood for Forward Link Only, meaning that the data transmission path is one way, from the tower to the device. The MediaFLO system transmitted data on a frequency separate from the frequencies used by current mobile telephone networks. In the United States, the MediaFLO system used frequency spectrum 716-722 MHz, which had previously been allocated to UHF TV channel 55.01Nov2004 Qualcomm press release regarding 700 MHz spectrum usage for MediaFLO 

FLO was standardized within ETSI as TS 102 589, and has components standardized within the Telecommunications Industry Association (TIA 1099, 1102, 1103, 1104, 1120, 1130, 1132, 1146 and 1178.)

MediaFLO was a competitor to the Korean T-DMB, the Japanese 1seg and the European DVB-H standards.

Qualcomm conducted MediaFLO technical trials internationally, with the intention of forming partnerships with existing multi-channel content providers and service operators, but has since discontinued development.

Technology

The protocol was developed because of the inherent spectral inefficiency of unicasting high-rate full-motion video to multiple subscribers. Additionally, traditional analog television and over-the-air terrestrial digital television signals (DVB-T) were difficult to implement on mobile devices, due mostly to issues of power consumption. ATSC, used only by the United States and its neighbors, also has difficulty even with fixed reception due to multipath, and mobile ATSC-M/H (which is free-to-air from individual TV stations) was not finalized until 2008.

In addition, the transmission need not convey as high a resolution as would be needed for a larger display. MediaFLO streams are only 200-250 kbit/s, which would be insufficient for a larger screen size.

In the now defunct United States implementation, FLO was transmitted by a network of high-power broadcast transmitters operating at effective radiated powers as high as 50 kilowatts. The activation of many of these transmitters were delayed due to the official end of analog TV broadcasting on channel 55 being delayed. Immediately following the transition, the FLO network was expanded to several new markets, and coverage was enhanced in some existing ones.

The transmission was an encrypted OFDM set of QAM signals sent on a 5.55 MHz channel from 716-722 MHz (former UHF TV channel 55). The band was auctioned-off by the Federal Communications Commission (FCC) and known as the "Lower 700 MHz Block D". Qualcomm also bought, in a later auction, the use of former analog UHF TV channel 56 (722-728 MHz) in Boston, Los Angeles, New York, Philadelphia and San Francisco for additional services. However, this is owned by Manifest Wireless (a subsidiary of Dish Network's Frontier Wireless) in most other media markets, where ATSC-M/H signals were on air. All of the transmitters sent the same signal and used the same frequency, forming a single-frequency network. This allowed the mobile to decode the signal from more than one transmitter in the same way that it might if it was a multipath-delayed version from the same transmitter. All stations used callsign WPZA237, but each has an identifier indicating its group and number. For example, one station in the metro Atlanta media market was ATL-006, while another was ATL-014.

Some other operational parameters of MediaFLO are as follows:

All of the bearer (data) traffic occurred within an MLC using the 3500 non-overhead subcarriers. The protocol also contemplates a certain amount of inter-symbol time spacing, to allow for the effects of multi-path transmission and reception.

There is a window time TWGI included both before and after each OFDM symbol. However, since this window is shared between each two consecutive symbols, TS = TU + TWGI + TFGI.

Commercial roll-out

USA: FLO TV
In the U.S., all FLO television providers offered a set of 14 basic channels:
 2.FLO (6 am to 10 pm) — Original made-for-mobile reports and concerts; added in early 2010
 Adult Swim (10 pm to 6 am)
 ABC Mobile
 CBS Mobile — Containing a mixture of sports and other CBS content
 CNBC
 Comedy Central
 ESPN Mobile TV — Frequently simulcasting live sporting events from their family of networks
 Fox Mobile
 Fox News Channel
 MTV Mobile
 MSNBC
 NBC 2Go — A mix of MSNBC, NBC, CNBC, and Bravo networks 
 Disney Channel
 Nickelodeon

Adult Swim time-shares with 2.FLO, as it does on cable TV with Cartoon Network.

Additionally, the "FLO Preview Channel" was a free-to-view barker channel, available without subscription.

For conditional access, Verizon Wireless utilized its EVDO network to authenticate mobile handsets and provide the decryption keys necessary to decode the programming. Because of this, users who block data use to prevent unauthorized charge were also blocked from viewing any channels, including the preview channel.

There were 16 TV channels broadcast for Verizon. The additional Verizon channels include:
 MTV Tr3́s
 TLC

There were 16 TV channels broadcast for AT&T:AT&T Mobile TVThe additional AT&T channels are:
 CNN Live Mobile*
 Crackle — showing a variety of movies*

The standalone FLO TV Personal Television and FLO TV Automotive products also included CNN Live Mobile and Crackle.

Trials
Some trials were underway in Japan, Hong Kong and Taiwan, with no commitment for a commercial phase. In France, Qualcomm tried unsuccessfully to convince TDF to choose MediaFLO technology. In the UK, British Sky Broadcasting conducted trials of MediaFLO in 2006.

Devices 

Devices featuring MediaFLO were introduced by LG and Samsung at CES 2006 in Las Vegas. On December 1, 2005 Verizon Wireless and Qualcomm announced a partnership for the launch of the MediaFLO network. Verizon launched the service commercially as part of its VCAST offering on March 1, 2007, marketing the MediaFLO-specific technology/service as "VCAST TV". A similar announcement was made by AT&T Mobility in February 2007. AT&T Mobility launched their MediaFLO service on May 4, 2008. The first non-phone TV-only devices were released in late 2009.

FLO TV was first offered on certain wireless phones offered by Verizon Wireless and AT&T Wireless.

In November 2009 FLO TV introduced the FLO TV Personal Television mobile device (model PTV-350).

End of service
On July 21, 2010, Qualcomm CEO Paul Jacobs said the company planned to either sell its MediaFLO business or its spectrum, or to find a partner. The company had predicted the total cost to launch the service would be $800 million, including the $683 million the San Diego Union-Tribune says Qualcomm paid for the spectrum. At the time, the service covered as many as 68 million people, but many analysts confirmed that the project was losing money.

On October 5, 2010, Qualcomm signaled the end of the FloTV service by declaring that there would be no further sales of devices to consumers. Qualcomm indicated the service would be up and running through at least Spring 2011 but could be turned off at any point thereafter. The company said that the MediaFLO spectrum could be used for electronic magazines or newspapers, though such services could be offered alongside the existing broadcast channels. Qualcomm had even reached out to software developers for possible solutions.

On December 20, 2010, AT&T announced that it would purchase Qualcomm's FCC licenses in the 700 MHz band and that FLO TV service would be shut down on March 27, 2011. Qualcomm received $1.93 billion. Despite spending $132 million in the previous quarter on bolstering FLO TV, Qualcomm still made a profit on the sale, as it had originally paid $38 million for the former channel 55 and $558 million for the former channel 56.

See also
 Mobile TV a term for the category of techniques
 DVB-H (Digital Video Broadcasting - Handheld)
 DVB (Digital Video Broadcasting)
 DMB (Digital Multimedia Broadcasting)
 DAB (Digital Audio Broadcasting)
 DRM (Digital Radio Mondiale)
 1seg (mobile TV system on ISDB-T)
 ISDB-Tmm (Terrestrial mobile multi-media)
 Electronic program guide

References

External links
FLO TV home page 
RabbitEars.Info MediaFLO Transmitter List

Mobile television
Qualcomm